Little Moth, directed by Peng Tao, is a 2007 narrative independent Chinese film. The story revolves around a young girl who is forced to beg for money on the streets by a poor couple who has purchased her from a trafficker for this purpose.

Festivals
 Hong Kong International Film Festival
 Locarno International Film Festival
 Bucharest International Film Festival
 Cairo International Film Festival
 Brisbane International Film Festival

References

External links
 Little Moth at Internet Movie Database IMDb
 Little Moth at the Chinese Movie Database
 Little Moth on dGenerate Films website
 Review in Variety

2007 films
2007 drama films
Chinese docudrama films
Films set in China
Films based on Chinese novels
2000s Mandarin-language films
Chinese drama films